Veta is a 1986 Indian Telugu-language period action film starring Chiranjeevi, Jaya Prada and Sumalatha. It was released on 28 May 1986. The film was made by Samyuktha Movies, whose earlier blockbuster was Khaidi. The movie is based on Alexandre Dumas' 1844 novel The Count of Monte Cristo. The successful team of director A. Kodandarami Reddy, composer K. Chakravarthy and writers Paruchuri brothers was repeated in this movie as well.

Plot
Set in 1939, Pratap (Chiranjeevi) is a sailor working on a ship during the British rule of India. He is in love with a wealthy woman, played by Jaya Prada. Jaya Prada's cousin (బావ) Jayaram, who works for the British army, also wants to marry her. When the captain of the ship (C. S. Rao) is poisoned and killed by two of the crew members, Jayaram uses his power to twist Benarjee (Ranganath) and deports Pratap away for good at the secluded Andaman Jail. 

Pratap is trapped in this nightmare that lasts for thirteen years. Then Pratap escapes from the jail. He dives into the Andaman Sea and drowns. There he is saved by two sailors & immediately Pratap chokes & vomits & then starts to tell about his whereabouts to the sailors. Haunted by the baffling course his life has taken, over time everything he ever believed about right and wrong is abandoned and replaced by all-consuming thoughts of vengeance against those who betrayed him. He obtains the help of an equally innocent fellow inmate Mahendra Bhupathi (Jaggaiah), who was once a Jamindar, who opposed the British only to lose his wealth, wife, and daughter Jyothirmaye (Sumalatha). Mahendra Bhupathi was also betrayed by Jayaram and this common enemy is the target of vengeance for both the inmates. 

During his last breath,  Mahendra Bhupathi gives a secret map for his treasure, which he had hidden in a Malabar Island. Pratap replaces the dead body with himself in the burial sack and succeeds in his mission to escape from prison. He then finds the treasure and transforms himself into the mysterious and wealthy Jamindar. He then finds the daughter of Jaggayya, Jyothirmaye who is trying to seek vengeance and shelters her with him. With cunning ruthlessness, he cleverly insinuates himself into the high class nobility and systematically destroys the men who manipulated and enslaved him.

Cast 
 Chiranjeevi as Prathap, a sailor
 Jaya Prada as Saroja
 Sumalatha as Jyothirmaye
 Jaggayya as Mahendra Bhupathi
 Ranganath as Benarjee
 Nutan Prasad as Chowdappa
 Mohan Sharma as Jayaram

Crew 
 Director: A. Kodandarami Reddy
 Writers: Paruchuri Brothers
 Producers: Dhananjay Reddy & Dinesh Salgia (Hindi version)
 Music: K. Chakravarthy
 Cinematography: V.S.R. Swamy
 Editing: Vellaiswamy
 Lyrics: Veturi, Sirivennela Seetharama Sastry, Rajasri
 Playback singers: S. P. Balasubrahmanyam, K. J. Yesudas, P. Susheela, S. Janaki
 Choreography: Tara

Soundtrack

The music was composed by K. Chakravarthy and released through Saptaswar music label. Lyrics were written by Veturi, Sirivennela Seetharama Sastry and Rajasri.

References

External links 
 

1986 films
Films set in 1939
Films based on The Count of Monte Cristo
Films directed by A. Kodandarami Reddy
1980s Telugu-language films
Films scored by K. Chakravarthy
Indian action thriller films
Indian action drama films
Indian thriller drama films
Indian films about revenge
1986 action thriller films
1980s action drama films
1980s thriller drama films
1980s masala films
Films set in the British Raj
Indian remakes of British films
1986 drama films
Films set in the Andaman and Nicobar Islands